Washington Square is a surface light rail stop on the MBTA Green Line C branch, located in the median of Beacon Street  in the Washington Square neighborhood of Brookline, Massachusetts. Washington Square is the 4th-busiest surface stop on the line, with 1,091 daily boardings by a 2011 count. The station has two side platforms serving two tracks.

History

In the early 2000s, the MBTA modified key surface stops with raised platforms for accessibility. The renovation of Washington Square - part of a $32 million modification of thirteen B, C, and E branch stations - was completed by 2003.

The MBTA added wooden mini-high platforms, allowing level boarding on older Type 7 LRVs, at eight Green Line stations in 2006–07 as part of the settlement of Joanne Daniels-Finegold, et al. v. MBTA.  and Washington Square were originally to have one mini-high platform apiece as well; however, portable lifts were added at the stations instead.

References

External links

MBTA - Washington Square
Station from Washington Street entrance from Google Maps Street View

Green Line (MBTA) stations
Railway stations in Brookline, Massachusetts